Atriplex prostrata, called the spear-leaved orache, hastate orache, thin-leaf orache, triangle orache, and fat hen, is a widespread species of flowering plant in the saltbush genus Atriplex, native to Europe, Macaronesia, northern Africa, Ethiopia, the Middle East, western Siberia, and Central Asia, and introduced to temperate North America, South America, Australia, New Zealand, Korea, Japan, and Primorsky Krai in far eastern Russia. It is a facultative halophyte.

Subspecies
The following subspecies are currently accepted:

Atriplex prostrata subsp. calotheca (Rafn) M.A.Gust.
Atriplex prostrata subsp. latifolia (Wahlenb.) Rauschert
Atriplex prostrata subsp. polonica (Zapal.) Uotila
Atriplex prostrata subsp. prostrata

References

prostrata
Plants described in 1805
Flora of Malta